Achille Pintonello (6 September 1902 – 25 December 1994) was an Italian architect. His work was part of the architecture event in the art competition at the 1936 Summer Olympics.

References

External links
 

1902 births
1994 deaths
20th-century Italian architects
Olympic competitors in art competitions
Architects from Venice